Robert Rivers Everett (June 26, 1921 – August 15, 2018) was an American computer scientist. He was an honorary board member of the MITRE Corporation. He was born in Yonkers, New York.

In 1945 he worked with Jay Forrester on the Whirlwind project, one of the first real time electronic computers. In 1958 he was a founding member of the MITRE Corporation, and was its president from 1969 to 1986.

In 1983 he received the Medal for Distinguished Public Service from the Department of Defense and in 1989 he received the National Medal of Technology.

In 2009, he was named the winner of the 2008 Eugene G. Fubini Award for outstanding contributions to the Department of Defense (DoD).
In 2009, he was also made a Fellow of the Computer History Museum "for his work on the MIT Whirlwind and SAGE computer systems and a lifetime of directing advanced research and development projects."

References

1921 births
2018 deaths
People from Yonkers, New York
Scientists from New York (state)
American electrical engineers
Duke University alumni
Massachusetts Institute of Technology alumni
Mitre Corporation people
National Medal of Technology recipients

Duke University Pratt School of Engineering alumni